Khun Khun is a small village in Nakodar.  Nakodar is a tehsil in the city Jalandhar of Indian state of Punjab.

STD code 
Khunkhani's STD code is 01821 and post code is 144028.

References

Villages in Jalandhar district
Villages in Nakodar tehsil